Delaney Baie "D. B." Pridham (born September 2, 1997) is an American professional soccer player who plays as a forward for Damallsvenskan club Linköpings FC. She previously played collegiate soccer for the Santa Clara Broncos, and professionally for ÍBV in Iceland and Kristianstads DFF in Sweden.

Early and college career 

Pridham played youth soccer for De Anza Force in the ECNL and for her high school team, the St. Francis Lancers. She committed to Santa Clara University in June 2014, and joined the Broncos in 2016. 

Pridham made her debut on August 19, 2016, in a 3–2 win over USC. As a freshman, she played in 21 games, recording one assist. The following year, she made 20 appearances, scoring three goals and registering two assists, for a total of 8 points. As a junior, she appeared in all 22 games for the Broncos, once again recording three goals and two assists. In her last season at Santa Clara, she played in 16 games, recording two assists. She finished her time in college with a total of six goals and seven assists in 79 games.

Club career 

In January 2021, Pridham signed with Úrvalsdeild kvenna side ÍBV. She made a total of 12 appearances for ÍBV – ten in the league and two in the Icelandic Cup – and scored a total of eight goals, of which seven came in the league and one in the Cup.

On August 15, 2021, she joined Damallsvenskan club Kristianstads DFF. Ten days later, she made her debut in a 3–1 loss to BK Häcken. On August 18, 2022, she made her Champions League debut in a 3–1 defeat to Ajax. She left Kristianstad in December 2022.

On February 16, 2023, Pridham signed with Linköpings FC, following a successful trial period with the club.

International career 

In June 2022, she was named to Canada's preliminary roster for the 2022 CONCACAF W Championship.

Career statistics

Club 
.

Personal life 

Pridham majored in political science. She is the younger sister of Mackenzie Pridham.

References

External links

 
 Delaney Baie Pridham at Santa Clara University
 Delaney Baie Pridham at the Football Association of Iceland
 Delaney Baie Pridham at Linköpings FC

1997 births
Living people
American expatriate women's soccer players
American women's soccer players
Soccer players from California
De Anza Force women's players
Women's association football forwards
Santa Clara Broncos women's soccer players
Linköpings FC players
Kristianstads DFF players
Damallsvenskan players
Úrvalsdeild kvenna (football) players
ÍBV women's football players
Expatriate women's footballers in Iceland